John Frederick Dittbrender (July 11, 1878 in Theresa, Wisconsin – January 4, 1966) was a farmer. On March 3, 1900, he married Augusta Voeltz. He is buried in Easton, Marathon County, Wisconsin.

Career
Dittbrender was a member of the Assembly from 1939 to 1940. From 1915 to 1939, he had been Chairman of the Town of Ringle, Wisconsin. He was a member of the Wisconsin Progressive Party.

References

People from Theresa, Wisconsin
People from Marathon County, Wisconsin
Farmers from Wisconsin
Mayors of places in Wisconsin
Members of the Wisconsin State Assembly
Wisconsin Progressives (1924)
20th-century American politicians
1878 births
1966 deaths
Place of death missing